The Union Internationale Motonautique (UIM) is the international governing body of powerboating, based in the Principality of Monaco.  It was founded in 1922, in Belgium, as the Union Internationale du Yachting Automobile.

History
Member nations from 12 in 1927 to 60 in 2017.

Presidents
PRESIDENTS OF THE U.I.M.

1922-1944 	Alfred Pierrard  	Belgium

1946-1972 	Freddy Buysse 	Belgium

1972-1975 	Vittore Catella 	Italy

1975-1978 	Claude Bouilloux Lafont 	France

1978-1985 	Francesco Cosentino 	Italy

1985-1987 	Paul Lamberts 	Belgium

1987-2006 	Ralf Frohling 	Germany

2007  	Charles D.Strang 	U.S.A.

Since 2007  	Raffaele Chiulli  	Italy

Secretaries General
SECRETARIES GENERAL OF THE U.I.M.

1922-1925  	John Ward 	Ireland

1925-1965 	Maurice Pauwaert 	Belgium

1965-1972 	Henri Thomas 	Belgium

1973-1992 	José Mawet 	Belgium

1992-2011 	Régine Vandekerckhove 	Belgium

2011-2014    Andrea Dini    Italy

Since 2014 	Thomas Kurth 	Switzerland

World Championships conducted under UIM
  Circuit (F1H2o, F2, F500, F350, F250, F250, OSY400, GT-15, GT-30, FR1000 F4, Formula Future.), Circuit World, Circuit International Ordinary, Circuit Continental, Formula World, Formula Continental.
 Aquabike : (Jet ski) Aquabike International Ordinary, Aquabike World Series, Aquabike World, Aquabike Continental Series
  Offshore (XCAT, Class V1, Class V2, Powerboat P1 SuperStock,  Class 3D,  Class 3C,  OCR F1, 2, 3 & Sport (Group C Experimental),  Class 3A, Class 3B, Class 3J, Class 3X) Offshore World Series
  Pleasure Navigation: Pleasure Navigation World, Pleasure Navigation European :  World Pleasure Navigation Endurance Group B,  European Pleasure Navigation - Endurance Group B - Class Promotion.  World Pleasure Navigation Endurance Group B - Boat Production, World Pleasure Navigation Endurance Group B - Class S1, World Pleasure Navigation Endurance Group B - Class S2, World Pleasure Navigation Endurance Group B - Promotion.
  Radio-controlled boats: Defunct after 2016. Radio Controlled International Ordinary, Radio Controlled World,  Radio-controlled International Ordinary - Endurance E15, Radio-controlled International Ordinary - Endurance E27 2 hours, Radio-controlled International Ordinary - Endurance E3,5,  World Offshore Radio-controlled,  Radio-controlled International Ordinary - Endurance E27 2 hours,  Radio-controlled International Ordinary - Endurance 15 6 hours.
  MotoSurf Motosurf World Cup From 2021 :  Electric Challenge, Juniors Class, Open Class, Rookies Class, Stock Class, Women Class

National Authorities
The UIM has a membership of more than fifty national authorities, including:
American Power Boat Association (USA)
Australian Powerboat Association (AUS)
BPBA (BPBA Website) (UK)

Members
59 Nations in 2022:
 Asia: 10+4=14
 Oceana: 2+0=2
 Africa: 3+1=4
 America: 3+2=5
 Europe: 23+6=29

Full Member (46)

Corresponding Member (13)

Asia

See also

Association of IOC Recognised International Sports Federations
Inshore powerboat racing
Offshore powerboat racing
Class 1 World Powerboat Championship
Formula 1 Powerboat World Championship
UIM F2 World Championship
Formula 4S Powerboat World Championship
Aquabike World Championship (powerboating)
Offshore Super Series
Water motorsports at the 1908 Summer Olympics
Boat racing
Yacht
Seamanship
Fédération Internationale de Motocyclisme
Fédération Internationale de l'Automobile

References

External links
UIM Powerboating

International organisations based in Monaco
Motorboat racing
Sports organisations of Monaco
Motonautique